Valerio Mantovani (born 18 July 1996) is an Italian professional footballer who plays as a central defender for  club Ternana, on loan from Salernitana.

Club career

He began his youth career with A.S.D. Atletico 2000, then Roma. In 2013, he signed with Torino, winning the Campionato Berretti that season. The following year, he captained the Primavera youth team, winning the Campionato Nazionale Primavera and Supercoppa Primavera.

In July 2016, he was signed by Serie B club Salernitana. He made his professional debut in the Serie B on 26 August 2016 in a game against Spezia.

On 1 September 2022, Mantovani joined Ternana on loan.

Honours
Torino
Campionato Nazionale Dante Berretti: 2013–14
Campionato Primavera: 2014–15
Supercoppa Primavera: 2015

References

External links
 

Living people
1996 births
Footballers from Rome
Italian footballers
Association football defenders
U.S. Salernitana 1919 players
U.S. Alessandria Calcio 1912 players
Ternana Calcio players
Serie B players